Major General Harold Robert Parfitt (August 6, 1921 – May 21, 2006), was the last Governor of the Panama Canal Zone, from 1975 to 1979.

Biography
He was born in Coaldale, Pennsylvania on August 6, 1921 to William Parfitt and Elizabeth Patterson.

He graduated from the United States Military Academy at West Point in 1943; graduated from the Massachusetts Institute of Technology in 1948; graduated from the Command and General Staff College in 1955; Canadian National Defense College in 1962; and attended a six-week advanced management program at Harvard in 1967. He married Patricia Rose Scully on June 4, 1955.

Parfitt was commissioned second lieutenant of the United States Army in 1943; advanced through the ranks to major general in 1971. He served as commanding general, United States Army Engineer Center/Commandant, United States Engineer School at Fort Belvoir, Virginia, from late 1973 to March 1975.

He was Deputy, and later District Engineer of the Engineer Division, South Atlantic, in Jacksonville, Florida, from August 1962 to May 1965. In June 1965, he became lieutenant governor of the Canal Zone and vice president of the Panama Canal Company, serving until September 1968.

From December 1969 to August 1973, he was division engineer, U.S. Army Engineer Division, Southwest, Dallas, Texas. Parfitt was commanding officer of the 20th Engineer Brigade in Vietnam from November 1968 to November 1969.

Parfitt was appointed as Governor of the Panama Canal Zone on April 1, 1975, and served in that position until September 30, 1979.  He was the last U.S. governor of this region, as the post was abolished and replaced with the Panama Canal Commission.

Parfitt died on May 21, 2006 in Dallas, Texas. Interment was at Arlington National Cemetery.

Legacy
He is the father of Karen Hughes, who was a close advisor to president George W. Bush.

References

1921 births
2006 deaths
United States Military Academy alumni
Massachusetts Institute of Technology alumni
United States Army personnel of World War II
United States Army personnel of the Korean War
United States Army personnel of the Vietnam War
United States Army generals
Governors of the Panama Canal Zone
United States Army Command and General Staff College alumni
Burials at Arlington National Cemetery
People from Schuylkill County, Pennsylvania
Military personnel from Pennsylvania